The Board of Jewish Education (BJE) of Toronto, Ontario is the education department of UJA Federation of Greater Toronto, and is an administrative body that offers direction to the Greater Toronto Area's Jewish schools. In 2007 The BJE was replaced by Mercaz, The Centre for Enhancement of Jewish Education.

External links

 The Mercaz, The Centre for Enhancement of Jewish Education - Formerly the Board of Jewish Education (BJE) of Toronto.
 UJA Federation of Greater Toronto

Education in Toronto
School districts in Ontario
Educational institutions established in 1949
Jewish organizations based in Canada
1949 establishments in Ontario
2007 disestablishments in Ontario